Bir Bahadur Thagunna is a Nepalese politician, belonging to the Communist Party of Nepal (Unified Marxist-Leninist). He contested the 1999 legislative election in the Darchula-1 constituency, coming second with 16,656 votes.

References

Communist Party of Nepal (Unified Marxist–Leninist) politicians
Living people
Year of birth missing (living people)
Place of birth missing (living people)